Acacia sporadica, also commonly known as the pale hickory wattle,<ref name=atlas>{{cite web|url=https://bie.ala.org.au/species/https://id.biodiversity.org.au/node/apni/2894743#names|title=Acacia sporadica N.G.Walsh Pale Hickory-Wattle|accessdate=13 September 2020|work=Atlas of Living Australia|publisher=Global Biodiversity Information Facility}} </ref> is a shrub of the genus Acacia and the subgenus Phyllodineae that is native to a small area in Victoria

Description
Like most species of Acacia it has phyllodes rather than true leaves. The evergreen blue-green and glabrous phyllodes have an asymmetric obovate to oblanceolate shape that can sometimes be almost elliptic.

Taxonomy
The species was first formally described by the botanist Neville Walsh in 2004 as part of the work Two new wattles endemic to Victoria as published in the journal Muelleria.
Distribution
It has a disjunct distribution from around the Howqua River, and Carboor East and in areas close to Taradale where it is often situated on rocky hills as a part of woodlands or Eucalyptus'' forest communities.

See also
List of Acacia species

References

sporadica
Flora of Victoria (Australia)
Plants described in 2004
Taxa named by Neville Grant Walsh